SUPERM is an international multimedia art team founded in 2004 by Russian author and artist Slava Mogutin and American artist and musician Brian Kenny. The artists come from different backgrounds: Siberian-born Mogutin was exiled from Russia at the age of 21 for his queer writings and activism; Kenny was born on the American military base in Heidelberg, Germany, and grew up traveling throughout the US with his Catholic, military family. They are responsible for site-specific, multimedia gallery and museum shows in New York City, Los Angeles, London, Berlin, Stockholm, Oslo, Bergen, Moscow, and León (Spain). 

SUPERM's work uses all available media and source materials, ranging from reclaimed furniture and street art to personal fetish gear, hair and body fluids. Their installations combine photography, video, sound, text, drawing, painting, sculpture, collage, and performance. Using their selves and their friends as models, actors, and collaborators, SUPERM creates a multidisciplinary body of site-specific work that reaches audiences far beyond the usual art crowd. Transgressive, political and personal, SUPERM work is a response to a world of shameless war propaganda, media brainwashing, corporate censorship, state-induced paranoia, and shrinking personal freedoms; a world where natives of countries outside the European Union and the USA are treated as second-class citizens and nonconformists artists as criminals.

Their videos have recently been shown at the GLBT Film Festival, The International Short Film Festival Oberhausen, MIX NYC, Revolution & Sexual Revolution Film Festival in Tokyo, Paris Gay & Lesbian Film Festival, PornfilmfestivalBerlin (2nd Prize in Short Film Competition), as well as various art and club venues across Europe and the US.

SUPERM collaborators include Joakim Andreasson, Gio Black Peter, Marko Brozic, Christophe Chemin, Tom Dura, Jason Farrer, Christophe Hamaide-Pierson, Dominic Johnson, Marcelo Krasilcic, Bruce LaBruce, Josh Lee, Billy Miller, Dmitriy Rozin, and Desi Santiago.

Filmography
 COP SHOT (2007)
 SUPERM Highway ("On a Highway I Drive Very Fast") (2006)
 Curses, Hexes & Boots (2006)
 Pay My Billz Jockstrap Dawgz (2006)
 Teen Werewolf Workout! (2006)
 Wake Up Paperboy! (2006)
 Ninja Independence Day (1999)

References

External links
SUPERM show at MUSAC
SUPERM interview on Flasher.com
SUPERM Salon
WIGGERS, a SUPERM show in Berlin
SUPERM Projects on SLAVAMOGUTIN.COM

Video artists
Public art
Performance artist collectives